Mount Alberta is a mountain located in the upper Athabasca River Valley of Jasper National Park, Alberta, Canada. J. Norman Collie named the mountain in 1898 after Princess Louise Caroline Alberta. It is the most difficult of the 11,000ers from a climbing point of view.

Mount Alberta is the fifth-highest peak of the Canadian Rockies and the third highest in Alberta. According to the Climber's Guide, Mount Alberta is "One of the finest peaks in the Rockies, a singular uplift that is difficult on all sides."


Climbing 
History
The first ascent was made in 1925 by members of the Japanese Alpine Club:  S. Hashimoto, H. Hatano, T. Hayakawa, Y. Maki, Y.Mita, N. Okabe. The team was guided by Hans Fuhrer, H. Kohler and J. Weber, and the leader of the team was Maki. This team consisted of four Keio University alpine club members and two Gakushuin University alpine club members. They started climbing on July 21, 1925. After some difficulty in dealing with an overhang and a steep series of ledges for 16 hours, they reached the top and ceremoniously planted an ice axe. The ice axe was left as a symbol of their achievement. The second party that achieved the ascent found this ice axe 23 years later, and brought it back to the American Alpine Club in New York. The handle of the ice axe had been broken by the ice and rocks. In 1969, the handle was found by a Japanese party, and the two parts were put together in Tokyo in 1997. This ice axe is now exhibited in Jasper Yellowhead Museum.

The second ascent was completed in 1948 by Americans Fred Ayers and John Oberlin. In 1958, the first ascent by a Canadian team was completed by Neil Brown, Hans Gmoser, Leo Grillmair, Heinz Kahl and Sarka Spinkova.

Routes
There are a number of standard climbing routes:
 Japanese Route (Normal Route) V 5.6
 North Face VI 5.9 A3
 North-East Ridge V 5.10

See also 
 List of mountains of Canada
 List of mountains in the Canadian Rockies

References

External links 
 Mt. Alberta on SummitPost

Gallery

Mountains of Jasper National Park
Three-thousanders of Alberta
Winston Churchill Range